Psychos in Love is a 1987 American black comedy horror film directed by Gorman Bechard.

Plot
Joe, a bartender, and Kate, a manicurist, meet after trying to find a significant other for a long time. They are both murderers. Before meeting Kate, Joe murdered many women after bringing them to his home. A cannibal plumber, Herman, blackmails the serial killers.

Production
Carmine Capobianco said of the script, "We decided to do something that was totally off the wall, totally fun". The part of Herman the Plumber was played by Frank Stewart, for whom the role had been especially written.  Many of the scenes were improvised and the music was played on a Casio CZ synthesizer.

A play adapted from the film was released in 2003 at the Broom Street Theater. It screened at the Bleecker Street Cinema, receiving much coverage from news outlets.

Reception
A TV Guide review said, "While certainly not for the squeamish, PSYCHOS IN LOVE does have a certain grotesque charm and may achieve a minor sort of cult status among fans of the bizarre".

Bill Gibron of DVD Talk wrote, "This critic didn't like this movie when he first saw it back in the late '80s, and nothing has changed since then. He didn't find it funny, inventive, or scary".

Home media
Psychos in Love was released on VHS in 1987 by Wizard Video. The film was released on DVD by Shriek Show, a division of Media Blasters, in 2009. The special features include commentaries, a behind the scenes look at the film's production, multiple beginning credits, longer scenes, the film's trailer, a picture gallery, and parts of the stage production. The film is also available on the Xbox Marketplace.

On September 26, 2017, the film was released on DVD and Blu-ray by Vinegar Syndrome.

References

External links 
 

American black comedy films
1987 horror films
1987 films
Films directed by Gorman Bechard
American comedy horror films
Films about weddings
1980s English-language films
1980s American films